Shamankhel or Shaman Khel (Pashto: شمن خېل) is one of the Mahsud subtribes. They live in three different places in South Waziristan. Ladha, Sararogha, and Serwekai.

Sub-castes
Shamankhel are divided by four sub-castes:
 Chiyarkhel
 Khalikhel
 Badinzai
 Galishai

Notable people
Manzoor Pashteen

External links
nps.edu

Karlani Pashtun tribes